Martin M. Goldsmith (November 6, 1913 – May 24, 1994) was American screenwriter and novelist who wrote several classic B-movies including Detour (1945), which he adapted from his 1939 novel of the same name; Blind Spot (1947); and The Narrow Margin (1952), for which he earned an Academy Award nomination.

Goldsmith, at one time the brother-in-law of actor Anthony Quinn, also contributed some stories to The Twilight Zone in 1964.

Novels
Double Jeopardy (1938)
Detour (1939)
Shadows at Noon (1943)

Screenplays
Dangerous Intruder (1945)
Detour (1945)
The Lone Wolf in Mexico (1947)
Blind Spot (1947)
Shakedown (1950)
The Narrow Margin (1952)
Mission Over Korea (1953)
Overland Pacific (1954)
Hell's Island (1955)
Fort Massacre (1958)
The Gunfight at Dodge City (1959)
Cast a Long Shadow (1959)

References

1913 births
1994 deaths
American male screenwriters
20th-century American novelists
American television writers
Writers from New York City
20th-century American male writers
Novelists from New York (state)
Screenwriters from New York (state)
American male television writers
20th-century American screenwriters